Law of the Barbary Coast is a 1949 American historical crime western film directed by Lew Landers and starring Gloria Henry, Stephen Dunne and Adele Jergens.

The film's sets were designed by the art director Harold H. MacArthur.

Synopsis
After her brother is murdered in a saloon on the Barbary Coast in San Francisco, a woman goes undercover as a dance hall girl in order to gather evidence on the crime.

Cast
 Gloria Henry as Julie Adams  
 Stephen Dunne as Phil Morton 
 Adele Jergens as Lita  
 Ross Ford as Wayne Adams  
 Robert Shayne as Michael Lodge  
 Stefan Schnabel as Alexis Boralof  
 J. Farrell MacDonald as Sergeant O'Leary  
 Edwin Max as Arnold

References

Bibliography
 Michael L. Stephens. Art Directors in Cinema: A Worldwide Biographical Dictionary. McFarland, 2008.

External links
 

1949 films
1940s crime films
American crime films
1949 Western (genre) films
American Western (genre) films
Columbia Pictures films
Films directed by Lew Landers
Films set in San Francisco
Films set in the 1880s
American historical films
1940s historical films
American black-and-white films
1940s English-language films
1940s American films